Jinchang District is a former district of Suzhou in Jiangsu Province.

The postal code for Jinchang District is 215008 and the telephone code is 0512.

On 1 September 2012, Jinchang District was merged with Pingjiang District and Canglang District to form Gusu District.

Jinchang
County-level divisions of Jiangsu
Administrative divisions of Suzhou
1955 establishments in China